Ryan Michael Stewart Jones (born June 14, 1984) is a Canadian former professional ice hockey right winger. He was drafted in the fourth round, 111th overall, by the Minnesota Wild in the 2004 NHL Entry Draft and played for the Nashville Predators and Edmonton Oilers in the National Hockey League (NHL). He played out the remainder of his professional career with Kölner Haie of the Deutsche Eishockey Liga (DEL).

Playing career

Amateur
Jones grew up in Chatham, Ontario, playing minor hockey for the Chatham Cobras A program of the Ontario Minor Hockey Association (OMHA). He graduated to AAA hockey for the Chatham-Kent Cyclones of the Pavilion League before playing one season with the Blenheim Blades Jr C team and two seasons with the Chatham Maroons Jr.B. hockey club of the OHA.

Jones was selected by the Minnesota Wild in the fourth round of the 2004 NHL Entry Draft after his second season with the Maroons.

Jones earned a scholarship to play in the NCAA at Miami University in Oxford, Ohio, spending four years with the RedHawks men's ice hockey program in the Central Collegiate Hockey Association (CCHA).

Professional
Jones made his NHL debut with the Nashville Predators in the 2008–09 season opener. He scored his first career NHL goal on October 15 against goaltender Marty Turco of the Dallas Stars.

During the 2009–10 season, Jones was placed on waivers by the Predators and was subsequently claimed by the Edmonton Oilers on March 3, 2010.

Jones has affectionately been given the nickname "Junkman" by many of his fans, partly due to his propensity for so-called "garbage goals" and partly because he shares the same last name as former Major League Baseball pitcher Randy "Junkman" Jones.

On December 2, 2011, Jones scored his first career NHL hat-trick, scoring three third period goals in a 6–3 victory over the Columbus Blue Jackets.

After four seasons with the Oilers, Jones opted to explore free agency before later re-signing with Edmonton on a one-year contract on July 6, 2013.

On October 9, 2014, as an unrestricted free agent entering the 2014–15 season, Jones signed a professional try-out contract with the Utica Comets of the American Hockey League (AHL), the top minor league affiliate of the Vancouver Canucks.
 After just five games with the Comets, in which he added one assist, Jones was released from his try-out. On November 17, he then signed his first contract abroad, joining German Kölner Haie in the Deutsche Eishockey Liga (DEL) for the remainder of the playing season. On February 19, 2015, the Kölner Haie and Jones agreed on a two-year contract extension lasting until 2017.

After playing in his fifth season with Kölner Haie, following a semi-final defeat in the 2018–19 season, Jones announced his retirement from professional hockey after 12 seasons.

Career statistics

Awards and honors

References

External links

1984 births
Edmonton Oilers players
Houston Aeros (1994–2013) players
Ice hockey people from Ontario
Kölner Haie players
Living people
Miami RedHawks men's ice hockey players
Milwaukee Admirals players
Minnesota Wild draft picks
Nashville Predators players
Oklahoma City Barons players
Sportspeople from Chatham-Kent
Utica Comets players
Canadian ice hockey right wingers
AHCA Division I men's ice hockey All-Americans